Eugene Yelchin (born Yevgeny Arkadievich Yelchin, born October 18, 1956) is a Russian-American artist best known as an illustrator and writer of books for children.

His novel Breaking Stalin's Nose was awarded a Newbery Honor in 2012. The Assassination of Brangwain Spurge he co-authored with M. T. Anderson was named National Book Award Finalist for Young People's Literature in 2018.

His nephew was actor Anton Yelchin.

Education and early career
Yelchin was born in Leningrad, Russia, to a Jewish family. In 1979, Yelchin graduated from Leningrad State Theater Academy.

From 1979 to 1983 he designed sets and costumes for leading Russian theater companies including Alexandrinsky (Pushkin's) Theater and Akimov Comedy Theater in Leningrad.

In 1979–80, with a group of peers from the Theater Academy he co-founded Tomsk Children's Theater in Siberia.

In 1983 Yelchin emigrated to the United States. In 1988 Yelchin graduated from the Southern California Film School in Los Angeles and began directing TV commercials and illustrating advertising campaigns.

Books for children
In 2006 at the Society of Children's Books Writers and Illustrators conference Yelchin received Tomie DePaola Illustration Award and began writing and illustrating books for children.

His books have been published by Scholastic Press, Henry Holt, HarperCollins, Simon & Schuster, Roaring Brook Press, Candlewick Press, Clarion Books and Harcourt. They were translated into French, Italian, Japanese, Russian, Spanish, Chinese, Korean, Turkish, Romanian, Estonian, and Polish.

Selected awards 
In 2018 The Assassination of Brangwain Spurge he co-authored with Matthew Tobin Anderson was named National Book Award Finalist.

In 2012 Breaking Stalin's Nose, a middle grade novel that he wrote and illustrated received the Newbery Honor.

In 2010 his illustrations for The Rooster Prince of Breslov received a National Jewish Book Award.

In 2017 his novel The Haunting of Falcon House received Society of Children's Books Writers and Illustrators’ Golden Kite Award.

In 2011 Won Ton: A Cat Tale Told in Haiku that he illustrated received Society of Children's Books Writers and the Golden Kite Award.

Bibliography

As Author/Illustrator
 The Genius Under the Table. 2021. Candlewick Press 
 Spy Runner. 2019. Henry Holt and Company 
 The Assassination of Brangwain Spurge(with M.T. Anderson). 2018. Candlewick Press 
 Pip & Pup. 2018. HarperCollins Publishers  
 Spring Hare. 2017. Henry Holt and Company 
 The Haunting of Falcon House. 2016. Henry Holt and Company 
 Arcady's Goal. 2014. Henry Holt and Company  
 Breaking Stalin's Nose. 2011. Henry Holt and Company  
 The Next Door Bear. 2011. HarperCollins Publishers  
 Heart of a Snowman. 2009. HarperCollins Publishers 
 Ghost Files. 2008. HarperCollins Publishers

As Illustrator
 The Assassination of Brangwain Spurge 2018. Candlewick 
 The Rooster Who Would Not Be Quiet! 2017. Scholastic Press 
 Elephant in the Dark. 2015. Scholastic Press. 
 Crybaby. 2015. Henry Holt and Company  
 Won Ton and Chopstick. 2015. Henry Holt and Company 
 Seeds, Bees, Butterflies, and More! 2013. Henry Holt and Company  
 Dog Parade. 2011. Harcourt Children's Books  
 Won Ton, A Cat Tale Told in Haiku. 2011. Henry Holt and Company  
 The Rooster Prince Of Breslov. 2010. Clarion Books Houghton Mifflin Harcourt  
 Seven Hungry Babies. 2010. Atheneum Books For Young Readers  
 The Cobbler's Holiday Or Why Ants Don't Wear Shoes. 2008. Roaring Brook Press  
 Who Ate All The Cookie Dough? 2008. Henry Holt and Company  
 The House of a Million Pets. 2007. Henry Holt and Company

Paintings

Yelchin's paintings and drawings have been exhibited along with former Soviet non-conformist artists

 2002: "Russian Revolutions: Generations of Russian Jewish Avant-Garde Artists” at the Mizel Center for Arts and Culture
 2006: “Territories of Terror: Mythologies and Memories of the Gulag in Contemporary Russian-American Art” at Boston University (2006)
 2010: "Shattered Utopia: Russian Art of the Soviet and Post-Soviet Periods" at Fort Collins Museum of Contemporary Art

Yelchin is a member of the Jewish Artists Initiative of Southern California. His paintings and drawings are represented by Sloane Gallery of Contemporary Russian Art.

Other works
Yelchin created original storyboards for the popular Coca-Cola Polar Bears campaign and designed characters for several animated features including 2012 Oscar winner Rango directed by Gore Verbinski (2012 Oscar for Best Animated Feature).

Awards and Honors

National Book Award Finalist for Young People's Literature
Newbery Honor
2010: National Jewish Book Award in the Illustrated Children's Book category for The Rooster Prince of Beslov. Text by Ann Redisch Stampler.
SCBWI Golden Kite Award
SCBWI Crystal Kite Award
People Magazine Picks
New York Times Notable Children's Books
The New York Times Editor's Choice
Amazon Best Books of the Year
NPR Best Books of the Year
The Washington Post Best Books of the Year
Publishers Weekly Best Books of the Year
The Boston Globe Best Books of the Year
Huffington Post Best Picture Books of the Year
USA Today Sentinel Choice 
School Library Journal Best Books of the Year
Kirkus Revirews Best Books of the Year
Horn Book Fanfare Best Book of the Year
BookPage Best Children's Books of The Year
NY Bank Street Best Children's Book of the Year
Children's Book Review's Best Young Adult Books
New York Public Library Best Children's Books
Chicago Public Library Best of the Best Books
Booklist Editor's Choice
Booklist Top Ten Science Fiction and Horror for Youth
Junior Library Guild Selection
Booklist Top Ten Science Fiction, Fantasy and Horror
SLCSC Distinguished Work of Historical Fiction Award
Association for Library Service Notable Children's Books
Charlotte Huck Award for Outstanding Fiction
Judy Lopez Memorial Award
William Allen White Children's Book Award 
Oklahoma Sequoyah Book Award 
International Reading Association Award
Editor's Choice by Historical Novel Society
Nerdy Book Club Best Books of the Year
CCBC Librarians Book of the Week

References

External links

  with linked gallery, Books for children, Design for film, TV, & advertising, and more
 Sloane Gallery Of Art
 

Interviews:

Bird, Elizabeth. "The Assassination of Brangwain Spurge by M.T. Anderson and Eugene Yelchin." Fuse 8, June 2018.
Anderson, M.T.. "M.T. Anderson and Eugene Yelchin: Finding a Common Language." Shelf Awareness. June 2018
Yelchin, Eugene. "The Book That Changed My Life: A Dangerous Book."  The Horn Book  May, 2018
Anderson, M.T.. "In Conversation: M.T. Anderson and Eugene Yelchin." Publishers Weekly. September, 2018
Goddu, Krystyna Poray. "Q & A with Eugene Yelchin" Publishers Weekly. October, 2014
Lushchevska, Oksana. "An interview with Eugene Yelchin" WGRCLC Blog. May, 2013

1956 births
American children's book illustrators
American children's writers
Jewish American artists
Jewish American writers
Soviet Nonconformist Art
Painters from Saint Petersburg
Writers from Saint Petersburg
Living people
Soviet emigrants to the United States
American people of Russian-Jewish descent
21st-century American Jews